Eytan Fox (born on August 21, 1964) is an Israeli film director.

Biography
Eytan Fox was born in New York City. His family immigrated to Israel when he was two. His father, Seymour Fox, was a Conservative rabbi and a professor of Jewish education at the Hebrew University of Jerusalem. His mother, Sara Kaminker-Fox, was the head of the Jerusalem city council and involved in Jerusalem urban planning. Fox has two brothers, David and Danny. He grew up in Jerusalem, served in the army, and studied at Tel Aviv University's School of Film and Television. He is openly gay and many of his films contain themes of homosexuality, as well as the effect the Israeli–Palestinian conflict has on interpersonal relationships.

Fox and his partner, Gal Uchovsky, have a long-term relationship. They are also professional collaborators, Uchovsky, a screenwriter, producer and journalist, is involved in much of the scriptwriting for Fox's movies.

His 2002 film Yossi & Jagger is a portrayal of the love between two young Jewish military men while completing their mandatory national service. In 2004 film Walk on Water, he takes on the thorny topics of racism/discrimination and confronting the Nazi past of two young upper class Germans. Lior Ashkenazi plays a Mossad assassin under cover as a tour guide. In 2006 film The Bubble, he asks the big question: What is love? as the film follows three young Tel Aviv residents, a female political activist and her two gay roommates, one of whom (the same actor from Yossi & Jagger) falls in love with a Palestinian (who also appears as a waiter) while on border guard duty as part of his national military service.

Awards
In 2006, Fox was the first recipient of the Washington Jewish Film Festival's Decade Award, a prize given to a filmmaker whose work has made a significant contribution to Jewish cinema over a period of at least ten years.

Filmography

Films
 After (1990)
 Shirat Ha'Sirena (Siren's Song, 1994)
 Yossi & Jagger (2002) 
 Walk on Water (2004) 
 The Bubble (2006) 
 Yossi (2012), a sequel to Yossi & Jagger
 Cupcakes (Bananot) (2013)
 Sublet (2020)

Television
 Sipurim Kzarim Al Ahava, episode "Ba'al Ba'al Lev" (1997)
 Florentin (1997)
 Tamid Oto Chalom (2009) released in UK and US in 2011 as Mary Lou, and starring Ido Rosenberg, Alon Levi, and Dana Frider
 The Bar Mitzvah (2018)

References

External links 

"Between Sex And Country: The Films of Eytan Fox"
"Eytan Fox Brings Israeli Films to America"
Fantastic Mr. Fox

1964 births
Living people
20th-century American Jews
American emigrants to Israel
German-language film directors
20th-century Israeli Jews
Israeli film directors
LGBT film directors
Gay Jews
21st-century Israeli Jews
Israeli gay writers
Israeli LGBT screenwriters
Israeli male screenwriters
Gay screenwriters
21st-century American Jews